The Weston Homes PGA International Seniors was a men's professional golf tournament for players aged 50 and above as part of the European Seniors Tour. It was played just once, in September 2008, at the Stoke by Nayland Hotel, Golf & Spa, Stoke-by-Nayland, Suffolk, England. Nick Job won the event, two strokes ahead of Carl Mason. The total prize fund was £175,000 with the winner receiving £26,250.

Winners

External links
Coverage on the European Senior Tour's official site

Former European Senior Tour events
Golf tournaments in England
Sport in Suffolk